Salman Abu Sitta (born 1937) is a Palestinian researcher. He is most known for mapping Palestine and developing a practical plan for implementing the right of return of Palestinian refugees.

Early life
Salman Abu Sitta was born in 1937 into a Palestinian family. His family's land and the village bore their name, Ma'in Abu Sitta (the Abu Sitta springwell), in Beer Sheba District of Mandatory Palestine. One morning in April 1948, he and other schoolboys were sent home for safety reasons, after they were summoned by the headmaster and told that the Jews had occupied central Palestine. Abu Sitta made the 40 km journey from Beer Sheba town to his home on foot, and six weeks later the family was attacked by the Jewish militia before Israel was declared a country. They became refugees in the Gaza Strip. 

Abu Sitta graduated from al-Saidiya secondary school in Cairo, Egypt, ranking first in Egypt. After graduating from Cairo University's Faculty of Engineering in 1958, Abu Sitta went to the United Kingdom to continue his post-graduate studies, receiving his PhD in Civil Engineering from the University of London, UCL.

Career 
He was a member of the Palestine National Council. He studied refugee affairs and authored over 400 papers on the subject. He directed international development and construction projects. He was the founder and President of the Palestine Land Society (PLS) He was the General Coordinator of the Right of Return Congress.

Abu Sitta engaged in debates with Israelis who professed interest in peace without the return of the refugees, including Uri Avnery and Rabbi Michael Lerner.

Palestinian exodus (al Nakba)
Abu Sitta spent 40 years digging for information related to Palestine before, during and after al Nakba, the destruction of Palestine. Abu Sitta's work ensured that "the memories and identity of the occupied homeland are never lost". He is regarded by Uri Avnery as perhaps 'the world's foremost expert on the Nakba'. The documentation process began when he was 30 years old, when he stumbled on the memoirs of the Turkish chief of Beersheba, when Palestine was under Ottoman rule. The document dated to the early twentieth century.

"It sort of started from there, and it has never stopped," Abu Sitta says. "I kept collecting all and any material on every inch of my homeland."

Abu Sitta's claimed to show that the return of the refugees to their homes is sacred to Palestinians, legal under international law and possible without major dislocation to the Jewish settlers in Palestine. His work also includes the compendium Atlas of Palestine 1917- 1966.

Published works
 The Return Journey (2007) Palestine Land Society 
  Atlas of Palestine, 1917- 1966  Palestine Land Society (December 2010) 
 The Palestinian Nakba 1948: The register of depopulated localities in Palestine (Occasional Return Centre studies) (1998 reprinted 2000) Palestinian Return Centre

Articles
 Peace Palestine Traces of Poison: Israel's Dark History Revealed
 Geography of Occupation 
 Palestine Remembered Palestine Right Of Return, Sacred, Legal, and Possible
 Jerusalemite 7 June 2007 "Atlas of Palestine 1948: Reconstructing Palestine"

Youtube
'Right of Return Conference, Day 1:Keynote Address 13 May 2013.

References

External links
 Uri Davis:  In Search of the Abu Sitta Sword
 Palestine Land Society

1937 births
Living people
Alumni of the University of London
Cairo University alumni
Palestinists
Palestinian non-fiction writers
Politicians from Beersheba
Palestinian refugees